Heinz Valk (birth name Heinrich Valk; born March 7, 1936, in Gatchina) is an Estonian artist, caricaturist and politician.  He is credited for coining the term "Singing Revolution" and its slogan  "One day, no matter what, we will win!" some of the most famous and prophetic sentences describing the Estonians' non-violent freedom fight in 1988–1991 against the then Soviet occupation regime, which eventually was indeed successful as Estonians "won" when the country restored its full independence in August 1991.

References

1936 births
Living people
People from Gatchina
Estonian Centre Party politicians
Estonian caricaturists
20th-century Estonian male artists
21st-century Estonian male artists
Estonian Academy of Arts alumni
Recipients of the Order of the National Coat of Arms, 3rd Class
Estonian independence activists
Recipients of the Order of the White Star, 4th Class